Babelomurex princeps is a species of sea snail, a marine gastropod mollusc in the family Muricidae, the murex snails or rock snails.

Description
The shell size varies between 25 mm and 45 mm

Distribution
This species is distributed in the Persian Gulf, the Indian Ocean along Mauritius and in the Pacific Ocean along the Philippines

References

 Oliverio M. (2008) Coralliophilinae (Neogastropoda: Muricidae) from the southwest Pacific. In: V. Héros, R.H. Cowie & P. Bouchet (eds), Tropical Deep-Sea Benthos 25. Mémoires du Muséum National d'Histoire Naturelle 196: 481–585. page(s): 539.

External links
 

princeps
Gastropods described in 1912